Chesterfield Inlet (Inuktitut: Igluligaarjuk, syllabics: ᐃᒡᓗᓕᒑᕐᔪᒃ) is a hamlet located on the western shore of Hudson Bay, Kivalliq Region, in Nunavut, Canada, at the mouth of Chesterfield Inlet. Igluligaarjuk is the Inuktitut word for "place with few houses", it is the oldest community in Nunavut. The community is served by air, Chesterfield Inlet Airport, and by an annual supply known as sealift.

Inuit from the Chesterfield Inlet region are called Qaernermiut, though previously, they were referred to as Kenepitic, Kenepetu or Kenepitu.

Demographics

Broadband communications 
The community has been served by the Qiniq network since 2005. Qiniq is a fixed wireless service to homes and businesses, connecting to the outside world via a satellite backbone. The Qiniq network is designed and operated by SSI Micro. In 2017, the network was upgraded to 4G LTE technology, and 2G-GSM for mobile voice.

Climate
Chesterfield Inlet has a subarctic climate (Dfc) with short but cool summers and long cold winters.

See also

List of municipalities in Nunavut
 Charlie Panigoniak
 Kiviaq
 Aivilingmiut
 Ukkusiksalik National Park
 Caribou Inuit

References

Further reading

 King, David Paul. The History of the Federal Residential Schools for the Inuit Located in Chesterfield Inlet, Yellowknife, Inuvik and Churchill, 1955-1970. Theses Canada digitization project. Ottawa: Library and Archives Canada, 2000. 
 Tella, Subhas. Precambrian Geology of Parts of Tavani, Marble Island, and Chesterfield Inlet Map Areas, District of Keewatin A Progress Report. [Ottawa], Canada: Geological Survey of Canada, 1986. 
 Choque, Charles : 75ème anniversaire de la premiere mission catholique chez les Inuit de la Baie d'Hudson, Chesterfield Inlet 1912-1987 Igluligaarjuk.

External links

Hudson's Bay Company trading posts in Nunavut
Populated places on Hudson Bay
Hamlets in the Kivalliq Region
Populated places established in 1911
Road-inaccessible communities of Nunavut